A list of films released in Japan in 1956 (see 1956 in film).

See also
1956 in Japan

References

Sources

External links
Japanese films of 1956 at the Internet Movie Database

1956
Japanese
Films